"Revealing Same Sex Secret Crush" (alternatively known as "Same-Sex Secret Crushes" and "Secret Crushes on People of the Same Sex") is an unaired episode of the American tabloid talk show The Jenny Jones Show. Filmed on March 6, 1995, in Chicago, Illinois, the episode was intended to air in May 1995 as part of the show's fifth season. The episode featured six guests who were invited to meet a secret admirer on the show; unknown to the guests was that their secret admirers were all of the same-sex. Each secret admirer publicly revealed their crush to a guest, with presenter Jenny Jones interviewing the two afterwards. Three days after the episode's taping, one of the guests, Jonathan Schmitz, murdered his secret admirer Scott Amedure. The episode was subsequently shelved; however, it was later shown to jurors during Schmitz's trial for the first-degree murder of Amedure.

"Revealing Same Sex Secret Crush" was derided by many media commentators and audiences as an incitement of Amedure's murder. Jones and the show's producers defended the episode; they claimed that the topic of same-sex crushes was light-hearted and that Schmitz's subsequent actions were unforeseeable. The Jenny Jones Show was sued by Amedure's family over the episode, however, the court ultimately found that the producers could not reasonably anticipate a murder resulting from Amedure and Schmitz's appearance on the program. The controversy surrounding the episode resulted in a national debate over the negative effects of shock value and tabloid television in the United States, which prompted some television executives to tone down the sensationalized nature of their programs. "Revealing Same Sex Secret Crush" and the subsequent murder of Amedure were the subject of several true crime documentaries.

Synopsis
The episode opened with presenter Jenny Jones questioning the studio audience over how they would reveal a "secret crush" to another person. Jones specifically asked if one would "tell that person that you're gay and you hope that he is on national television", which resulted in an eruption of cheers and applause. Jones then explained that six guests were flown in to appear on the show under the pretense that they were to meet a secret admirer. The guests, however, were not aware of their secret admirer's sex. The secret admirers were individually brought out prior to their crushes, in which they were briefly interviewed by Jones. Jones asked each secret admirer to explain how they knew of their crush in addition to discussing any sexual fantasies they had about them. While the secret admirer was interviewed, their crush was backstage in a green room wearing soundproof headphones. Following the secret admirer's interview, Jones called for the crush to remove their headphones and enter the stage. The secret admirer then expressed their feelings for their crush, with the crush then seeing a video replayed of the secret admirer discussing their fantasies. Jones then conducted a brief interview among the two, with the crush having an opportunity to explain if they were interested in pursuing a relationship with their secret admirer.

The first secret admirer introduced was Jennifer Blevins, a transexual woman with a crush on her bartender friend Richard. While Richard found Blevins attractive, he rejected her after she revealed that she was transexual. The second secret admirer introduced was Gary Palmer, a gay man with a crush on "Mr. Hotlanta" contest winner Dean Steve. Steve, who was also gay, rejected Palmer as he was already in a relationship. Jones then introduced Scott Amedure, a gay man interested in acquaintance Jonathan Schmitz; Amedure's friend Donna Riley accompanied him, as she was a mutual friend of both men. Unlike the other secret admirers, Amedure was unsure of his crush's sexual orientation. After Amedure revealed his crush, Schmitz claimed he was flattered but "definitely heterosexual". Following this reveal, Jones introduced Ericka Davis, a woman with a crush on her fiancé's co-worker Sara Jimenez. Jimenez rejected Davis as she was not interested in a same-sex relationship. Jones then introduced Roney Perez, a gay man with a crush on dancehall patron Jim. Jim claimed that Perez was not his "type", but he was open to going on a date. Finally, Eric Smith revealed that he had a crush on Dave, a straight zookeeper that frequented the same mall as him. Dave was not romantically interested, but claimed he was open to a friendship with Smith. Jones ended the episode by recapping the outcomes between the secret admirers and their respective crushes, in which she then asked viewers to call into the show if they were interested in participating in another same-sex crush episode.

Production
"Revealing Same Sex Secret Crush" followed a rising trend in talk show episodes about secret crushes; episodes on the topic were previously aired by tabloid talk shows such as Maury ("Guests Reveal Feelings for Each Other of the Same Sex") and The Montel Williams Show ("Montel Plays Matchmaker by Uniting Secret Crushes"). The Jenny Jones Show had previously aired several episodes that covered the topic of secret crushes, with one that specifically involved same-sex crushes airing in November 1994. Topic selection was the responsibility of the show's producers, who typically presented Jones with an episode's topic the night before its taping. According to one of the show's executive producers, the topic of same-sex secret crushes was intended to be "romantic" and reminiscent of a "love story". Jones claimed that she had virtually no involvement in writing or planning the episode, although she believed the episode's topic was "light hearted". She commented: "It was a fun show, it really was. Secret-crush shows are always fun ... I loved the ‘same-sex’ angle and I’m always looking for ways to include gay people in our shows." Jones further stated that she knew the episode's topic may be sensitive for some people, although she contended that it was not meant to humiliate anyone.

On a previous episode, Jones promoted a casting call "for people who wanted to reveal a secret crush on national television." After conducting a pre-screening interview with the proclaimed secret admirer, producers cold called the secret admirer's crush to see if they had interest in appearing on the program. The producers did not inform the crushes of their secret admirer's identity, only telling them that the secret admirer could either be a man or woman. One of the guests, however, claimed that producers intentionally led him to believe that his secret admirer was a woman. According to Jim Paratore, president of Telepictures Productions, the production company behind The Jenny Jones Show, all guests were fully briefed on the contents of the episode prior to their appearance. Producer Karen Lautens Campbell additionally claimed that "[all guests] came on of their choice and had fun." The producers did not screen guests to determine if any of them had a history of mental illness. A sociologist claimed that she reached out to producers prior to the episode's taping in order to inform them of "the dangers of ambush TV." Filmed in Chicago, Illinois, on March 6, 1995, "Revealing Same Sex Secret Crush" was intended to air in May 1995 as part of the show's fifth season.

Murder and litigation
On March 9, 1995, three days after the episode's taping, Amedure left a "sexually suggestive" note on Schmitz's doorstep. Upon seeing the note, Schmitz left his apartment to purchase a 12-gauge shotgun, drove to Amedure's home, and fired two shots into his chest. Minutes after shooting Amedure, Schmitz called 911 from a nearby gas station to confess to the killing. Schmitz was charged with the first-degree murder of Amedure. Schmitz's attorneys claimed that a culmination of factors were responsible for his actions: bipolar disorder, Graves' disease, suicidal tendencies, and a childhood experience involving public humiliation. Additionally, Schmitz's attorneys used the gay panic defense, in which they argued that Schmitz became emotionally unstable due to feelings of humiliation over Amedure revealing his attraction to Schmitz. In 1996, a jury convicted Schmitz on the lesser charge of second-degree murder. He was sentenced to 25 to 50 years in prison, with the opportunity for parole beginning in 2017. Speaking on the verdict, a juror stated, "We saw the show as a catalyst in a young man's life who had a lot of problems. It sent his life back into an emotional tailspin." Schmitz spent two years in prison before his verdict was overturned on appeal, as the court held that Schmitz should have been able to remove a juror before the trial began. Schmitz was retried and convicted in 1999, with the original verdict reinstated.

In 1999, Amedure's family filed a lawsuit against The Jenny Jones Show and Warner Bros. for negligence in Amedure's death, in which they sought damages of $71.5 million. Amedure's family claimed that Schmitz was "ambushed" into appearing on the program and had no knowledge that the segment was about same-sex crushes; as a result, they alleged that the producers should have known the segment would incite violence. On May 7, 1999, a jury awarded Amedure's family $25 million; $6,500 in funeral expenses, $5 million in damages for Amedure's suffering before he died, $10 million for the loss of companionship, and $10 million for the loss of money Amedure would have earned. In 2002, however, the Michigan Court of Appeals overturned this judgment in a 2-1 panel decision. The court deemed Amedure's murder as "unforeseeable" and found that the show "had no duty to anticipate and prevent the act of murder committed by Schmitz three days after leaving [the] studio and hundreds of miles away". Jones claimed she was "elated" over the reversal, stating, "Scott Amedure’s murder was a horrible tragedy, but I have always believed that it was fundamentally wrong and unfair to blame the show." Geoffrey Fieger, the Amedures' attorney, filed an appeal over this reversal, although the Michigan Supreme Court and the Supreme Court of the United States denied to hear the case.

Legacy
The controversy surrounding the episode resulted in a national debate over shock value and tabloid television in the United States. These conversations particularly concerned the genre's reliance on overly personal revelations and explicit sexual matters, in addition to the use of "ambush" tactics. Dick Coveny, the executive vice president of Multimedia Entertainment, claimed that the episode's aftermath resulted in internal reviews of several similar-tabloid television series. He stated: "A great deal more caution is being exercised. Advertisers have had a great deal more input since this situation, though this situation is a total aberration." Some television presenters such as Maury Povich of Maury rejected the idea of altering the formats of their shows, however, executives involved with similar shows claimed that the genre experienced a "drastic toning down" following Amedure's death. According to Floyd Abrams, an attorney and expert on constitutional law, the fierce backlash surrounding the episode and subsequent lawsuit against The Jenny Jones Show discouraged other shows in the genre from putting guests into similar "volatile situations." The episode's aftermath also resulted in many talk shows implementing psychological profiling when searching for guests.

The episode and Amedure's subsequent murder also resulted in a national discussion over violence toward gay people, particularly concerning the gay panic defense. Some media commentators claimed that Schmitz's actions were purely fueled by homophobia, with  misplaced blame assigned to The Jenny Jones Show. Jones similarly believed that the murder of Amedure had "more to do with homophobia than anything else", further stating that it was "tragic" that Schmitz "would rather have been labeled a murderer than a homosexual." Conversely, some commentators contended that the murder was not motivated by homophobia, but rather it was a result of Schmitz feeling humiliated due to the "ambush" tactics used in the episode. Schmitz's use of the gay panic defense during his trial drew sharp criticism from many gay rights advocates, who deemed it a "homophobic legal tactic". Despite Schmitz never being charged with a hate crime offense, multiple media outlets have retrospectively categorized the murder as such. Some members of the American Bar Association cited the circumstances of the case as a central example as to why the gay panic defense should be banned nationwide.

While The Jenny Jones Show remained on air until 2003, its reputation was marred due to its association with Amedure's murder. In her memoir Jenny Jones: My Story, Jones claimed that media outlets, such as Today and USA Today, subsequently cancelled their scheduled interviews and positive media pieces regarding the show. The show's ratings peaked shortly before Amedure's murder during its fourth season; the Amedure family's lawsuit against the show was not settled until 2002, by which its ratings dwindled by 70 percent with a cancellation shortly after. Subsequent murders involving television guests, such as Nancy Campbell-Panitz of Jerry Springer and Svetlana Orlova of Patricia's Diary, have drawn heavy comparisons to Amedure's murder, with criticism directed at the "exploitive situations" depicted in their respective episodes. On May 11, 2020, Netflix released the true crime documentary series Trial by Media. "Revealing Same Sex Secret Crush" and the subsequent murder of Amedure served as the first episode's topic. Jones, Schmitz, and producers from The Jenny Jones Show declined an invitation to participate in the series. On April 15, 2021, HLN documentary series How It Really Happened aired a one-hour episode also dedicated to the topic titled "The Jenny Jones Show: Fatal Attraction".

See also
 Murder of Scott Amedure

References

Sources

External links
 

1995 American television episodes
1995 controversies
American LGBT-related television episodes
LGBT-related controversies in television
Television controversies in the United States